In Tahiti and Society Islands mythology, Fati (or Faiti) is the god of the Moon and a son of Taonoui and Roua.

See also
List of lunar deities

References

Tahiti and Society Islands gods
Lunar gods